Virus of the Mind or Mind virus typically refers to a kind of meme.  It may also refer to:

 Viruses of the Mind, an essay by Richard Dawkins
 Virus of the Mind: The New Science of the Meme, a book by Richard Brodie (programmer)
 "Virus of the Mind", a song from Heather Nova's sixth album, South